Financial Comptroller General Office (FCGO) is the main government agency responsible for the treasury operation of Government of Nepal. This office is under the Ministry of Finance and is headed by Financial Comptroller General who is a special class officer of Government of Nepal. FCGO is responsible for overseeing all government expenditure against budget, tracking revenue collection and other receipts and preparation of consolidated financial statements of the government.

References

Government agencies of Nepal
Finance in Nepal